James Rice (dates unknown) was an English amateur cricketer during the Napoleonic Wars.

Career
Rice made 3 known appearances in first-class matches from 1811 to 1813.  He is not known to have been attached to any particular club although, as an amateur who played all his first-class games at Lord's Middle Ground, it is possible he was a member of Marylebone Cricket Club (MCC), which was based at that venue.

The matches in which Rice appeared were the only first-class fixtures of the three seasons in question.  Cricket at this time had been badly impacted by a loss of both investment and manpower caused by the Napoleonic Wars.  The matches were also the only first-class matches recorded on Lord's Middle Ground so Rice played his entire first-class career at that ground.

References

External sources
 CricketArchive record

English cricketers
English cricketers of 1787 to 1825
Year of birth unknown
Year of death unknown
English amateur cricketers
Marylebone Cricket Club cricketers